The Xenakis Ensemble is a Dutch music ensemble dedicated to the performance of contemporary classical music. Based in Middelburg, it is known as one of the few ensembles specializing in the works of the composer Iannis Xenakis. It is frequently conducted by Diego Masson, who conducted the performances of many of Xenakis's works, as well as other guest conductors including Huub Kerstens. Its concertmaster is Mifune Tsuji.

The group was founded in 1980, at the initiative of the foundation Nieuwe MUZIEK Zeeland of Middelburg and the pianist Geoffrey Douglas Madge, with the approval of the composer Iannis Xenakis. Co-founder Ad van 't Veer died in June 2021.

Its repertoire includes over 40 compositions by Xenakis, some of which, such as À l'île de Gorée (1986), were written for the group. The ensemble also performs recent works by Luca Francesconi, Morton Feldman, Willem Breuker, Jin Hi Kim, Huib Emmer, and Bunita Marcus.

The Xenakis Ensemble has released several CDs of the music of Iannis Xenakis (one in collaboration with the harpsichordist Elisabeth Chojnacka), as well as several other composers.

Discography
1990 – Iannis Xenakis (Musifrance 2292-45030-2)
1995 – Xenakis Ensemble Live (BVHaast 9219)
1998 – Xenakis Ensemble (Bvhaast 9805)
1999 – Xenakis Ensemble (BVHaast 9903)
2000 – Xenakis - Orchestral & Chamber Works (Ultima). 2-CD set

See also
Iannis Xenakis

References

External links
Xenakis Ensemble page
[ All-Music entry]
 
Profile
Review of 1995 CD
Performances at the Ars Musica festival in Brussels

Musical groups established in 1980
Contemporary classical music ensembles
Chamber orchestras
Musical groups from Zeeland
Middelburg, Zeeland
1980 establishments in the Netherlands